DB13W3 (13W3) is a style of D-subminiature connector commonly used for analog video interfaces. The 13 refers to the total number of pins, the W refers to workstation and the 3 refers to the number of high-frequency pins.

Usage 
It was used primarily on Sun Microsystems, Silicon Graphics (SGI) and IBM RISC workstations, as well as some displays from Apple Computer, NeXT Computer and Intergraph Corporation. The 13W3 connector is no longer used with modern displays; it was superseded for use with analog displays by the VGA connector, and as the display market has moved to digital flat panel displays that has in turn been replaced almost entirely by digital connections (DVI, HDMI, or DisplayPort).

Non-video use 

A variant of the DB13W3 connector, with high-current pins instead of the high-frequency pins used for video applications, is also used by some 3Com SuperStack Ethernet switches to carry DC power.

It has also been used in various industrial appliances.

Specifications 
The connector contains 10 standard signal pins and 3 larger positions that can be fitted with either special pins with two concentric contacts for coaxial cable or with special high-current pins. When used for video signals on the computer side, the pins are female but the coaxial connectors in the large positions are male. The coaxial connectors carry the video signal split into red, green/gray, and blue; the standard signal pins carry four grounds, three "sense" pins used to communicate with the monitor, vertical sync, horizontal sync, and a composite sync signal.

The 13W3 connector can be converted into a standard VGA connector or DVI-A using commonly available cables and adapters. This allows multisync monitors, which became prevalent in personal computing in the late 1980s, to be used with these workstations as long as they are sync-on-green compatible. Likewise, later-generation Sun monitors, which began supporting multisync in 1998, can be connected via similar cables to personal computers.

Even though 13W3 is a standard connector, the sync signals are maintained on different pins based on the display and system. Sun, Intergraph, IBM and SGI each use different pin configurations for the monitor sense ID and sync signals. Sun and SGI each even have two different pin configurations: with and without Display Data Channel support. The Sun DDC connector was used at least on the UPA graphics adapters (Creator 3D, Expert 3D) and for their corresponding monitors (GD5410, GD5510). This can make matching the correct cable to the monitor virtually impossible. Many monitors with 13W3 connectors do not support separate sync as supplied on most PC systems. Other converters exist to allow connecting newer monitors with VGA connectors to the older systems and workstations. The most popular of these is a cable with a series of DIP switches built in that can be used to set the sync signals.

See also
 List of display interfaces

References

External links
 Sun FAQ - pinout for the 13W3 connector
 13w3 connector applications and pinouts
 Example of an Apple Inc. card which uses a 13w3 connector

Analog video connectors
Sun Microsystems
Silicon Graphics